Beicegel Creek is a stream in North Dakota, in the United States. It flows into Little Missouri River. 

Beicegel Creek derives its name from the Beisigl brothers, local cattlemen.

See also
List of rivers of North Dakota

References

Rivers of Billings County, North Dakota
Rivers of McKenzie County, North Dakota
Rivers of North Dakota
Little Missouri River (North Dakota)